Chen Chih-fu (born 25 August 1943) is a Taiwanese sailor. He competed in the Dragon event at the 1968 Summer Olympics.

References

External links
 

1943 births
Living people
Taiwanese male sailors (sport)
Olympic sailors of Taiwan
Sailors at the 1968 Summer Olympics – Dragon
Place of birth missing (living people)